Missing is an action thriller TV series. This is also the first collaboration between Singapore and Thailand.

It aired on Mediacorp Channel 5 every Mondays to Thursdays, 10:00pm to 11:00pm.

Cast

Main Cast

Guest Appearances

Supporting Cast (Singapore)

Supporting Cast (Thailand)

Webisode 
Besides the main episodes aired on Mediacorp Television, there are also webisodes that feature the same characters. Some webisodes follow the main story while some do not. The webisodes, if viewed on the Toggle website, can be viewed through a 360-degree view.

Plot 
Thirty years ago, Sean's brother, Sam, went missing. Having since worked his way up and been commissioned as an Inspector in the CID's Special Investigation Section, Sean gained access to narrow down his search to Bangkok, Thailand in hope of reuniting with his long - lost brother. On one such trip, Sean encounters Lynn, a jaded, self - serving tour leader who makes him out to be a pervert and child kidnapper, and gets him arrested. There they meet Aut, a high - flying, hot - shot Thai Inspector who seems to care more about his image than police work and, at the same time, is suspiciously familiar with the local gangs. Thus their lives collided and become intertwined, and what started as one man's search for his brother, quickly turns into a dangerous foray into the underbelly of an international human trafficking syndicate.

Trivia
 This is Ann Kok's first English drama series in over 25 years.

Synopsis

References

Mediacorp
2018 Singaporean television series debuts
2018 Singaporean television series endings
Triad (organized crime)